Hidra (historically spelled Hitterø) is the largest island in Agder county, Norway. The island has about 500 residents (in 2015), mostly living on the west side in Kirkehavn, where Hidra Church is located. The village of Rasvåg is another main village on the south side of the island. In 2007, the government of Norway studied the possibility of building an undersea tunnel to connect the island to the mainland without a ferry, but it was deemed to be too costly for the small benefit.

The island was the center of the old municipality of Hidra which existed from 1893 until 1965.

Geography
The island is almost entirely granite with some moraine deposits. The inner part of the island is much more hospitable, with oak and other deciduous trees. The island is divided nearly in two halves by the Rasvågfjorden, and the Eie Canal was built through the remaining isthmus so that small boats can pass all the way through.

Name

The Old Norse form of the name was Hitr. The name is probably derived from a word with the meaning "split" or "cleft" (referring to the fact that the island is almost split in two by the Rasvåg fjord).  Prior to 1918, the name was spelled Hitterø.

See also
List of islands of Norway

References

External links
Hidra's website 

Flekkefjord
Islands of Agder